Everything's Gonna Be Alright is the second studio album by American country music artist Deana Carter. Released in 1998 as her second and final studio album for Capitol Records Nashville, it features the single "Absence of the Heart", a number 16 hit on the Billboard Hot Country Singles & Tracks (now Hot Country Songs) charts in late 1998. "You Still Shake Me" and "Angels Working Overtime" were released as the second and third singles, and peaked at numbers 36 and 35, respectively. "Ruby Brown" failed to chart in the U.S., but managed to reach number 74 on the country charts in Canada.

Content
The title track to this album was written by Carter's father, Fred Carter, Jr. Also included is a cover of Melanie Safka's 1971 hit "Brand New Key". "Colour Everywhere" also appeared on the compilation Touched by an Angel: The Album.

Track listing

backing vocals: Lynyrd Skynyrd (Johnny Van Zant, Hughie Thomasson, Rickey Medlocke, Gary Rossington)
guitar solos: Gary Rossington and Hughie Thomasson
"Everything's Gonna Be Alright" (Fred Carter Jr.) – 5:18

Personnel

Musicians
Shawn Allan – drum programming
Matraca Berg – backing vocals on "Ruby Brown", "Dickson County"
Deana Carter – lead vocals, mandolin (on "You Still Shake Me"), backing vocals (all tracks except "Color Everywhere")
Joe Chemay – bass guitar
Dan Dugmore – steel guitar
Chris Farren – mandolin, drum programming, backing vocals (on "You Still Shake Me", "Absence of the Heart", "Michelangelo Sky", "Never Comin' Down", "Make Up Your Mind", "Angels Working Overtime", "Dickson County", "The Train Song")
Larry Franklin – fiddle
John Hobbs – piano, organ
Ron Huff – string arrangements and conductor on "Absence of the Heart" and People Miss Planes"
Chuck Jones – backing vocals ("Absence of the Heart", "Never Comin' Down")
G. Labeaud – backing vocals on "Colour Everywhere"
Steve Marcantonio – backing vocals on "Brand New Key"
Ricky Medlocke – backing vocals on "The Train Song"
Greg Morrow – drums, percussion
Steve Nathan – keyboards
Tom Roady – percussion
Gary Rossington – backing vocals and guitar solo on "The Train Song"
Brent Rowan – electric guitar
Darrell Scott – acoustic guitar on "Brand New Key"
Hughie Thomasson – backing vocals and guitar solo on "The Train Song"
Biff Watson – acoustic guitar
Johnny Van Zant – backing vocals on "The Train Song"
Michael Rhodes - bass (track 9)
 Children's choir ("Kid Connection") on "Angels Working Overtime" and "Everything's Gonna Be Alright": Janet McMahan, Kyle Reeves, Lauren Smith, Kelsy Morgenthaler, Jordan Dockery, Megan Dockery, Rachel Howell, Brittany Hargest, Matthew White
 String section on "Absence of the Heart" and "People Miss Planes":
 Violin: Carl Gorodetzky, Pam Sixfin, Conni Ellisor, David Davidson, David Angell, Mary Kathryn VanOsdale, Lee Larrison, Alan Umstead
 Cello: Bob Mason, Anthony LaMarchina, John Catchings, Julia Tanner

Technical
 Deana Carter – production (all tracks)
 Don Cobb – editing
 Chris Farren – production (all tracks except "Colour Everywhere")
 Kelly Giedt – production coordinator
 Tom Harding – additional engineering
 Thomas Johnson – assistant engineer
 Steve Marcantonio – engineering
 Denny Purcell – mastering
 Keith Thomas – production on "Colour Everywhere"
 Tim Waters – assistant engineer

Charts

Weekly charts

Year-end charts

References

1998 albums
Capitol Records albums
Deana Carter albums
Albums produced by Chris Farren (country musician)